Gallery Oldham is a free-to-view public museum and art gallery  in the Cultural Quarter of central Oldham, in Greater Manchester, England.

Design
Designed by architects Pringle Richards Sharratt, Gallery Oldham was completed in its original form in February 2002. The art gallery integrates local museum and gallery services. An extension to include the £13 million Oldham Library and Lifelong Learning Centre opened in April 2006. The building has library and learning facilities.

Programming
Programming incorporates Oldham's art, social and natural history collections alongside touring work, newly commissioned and contemporary art, international art and work produced with local communities.

The gallery holds the civic collection of Oldham and much of that of the wider Metropolitan Borough of Oldham.

Exhibits

It has a permanent display called Oldham Stories, exhibiting objects and specimens from across the collections and two temporary exhibition galleries. Gallery Oldham has one of the busiest exhibitions programmes in the region.  Exhibitions mix touring shows with work from the gallery's own collection of art, social history and natural history. 
The gallery holds work by local artists including Helen Bradley, William Stott and Alan Rankle and its collections include work by British artists L. S. Lowry, John William Waterhouse and Bridget Riley. In recent years the gallery has built up a collection of studio pottery and displays ceramic works by modern makers.

References

External links

Gallery Oldham Website

Art museums and galleries in Greater Manchester
Natural history museums in England
Local museums in Greater Manchester
Art museums established in 2002
2002 establishments in England
Buildings and structures in Oldham